The 1973 NCAA University Division basketball tournament involved 25 schools playing in single-elimination play to determine the national champion of men's NCAA University Division (now Division I, created later in 1973) college basketball. It began on Saturday, March 10, and ended with the championship game on Monday, March 26, in St. Louis, Missouri. A total of 29 games were played, including a third-place game in each region and a national third-place game.

Led by longtime head coach John Wooden, the UCLA Bruins won their seventh consecutive national title with an 87–66 victory in the final game over Memphis State, coached by Gene Bartow, a future head coach at UCLA. Junior center Bill Walton of UCLA was named the tournament's Most Outstanding Player. 

This was the first year that the championship game was held on a Monday night, with Saturday semifinals. Previously, the championship game was on Saturday, with the semifinals on either Thursday or Friday. Also, this was the first year matchups in the semifinals rotated; previously, it was East vs. Mideast and West vs. Midwest every year.

Tournament notes
The UCLA–Memphis State championship game made USA Today′s list of the greatest NCAA tournament games of all time at #18. Bill Walton set a championship game record, hitting 21 of 22 shots and scoring 44 points.

This tournament marked the first appearance of Bob Knight as coach of Indiana University.

The participation for this tournament, as well as the previous tournament, for Southwestern Louisiana (now the University of Louisiana at Lafayette) was vacated on August 5, 1973, when the NCAA Committee on Infractions ruled the university guilty of over 100 violations, including impermissible benefits and doctoring high school transcripts of players. USL's program was shut down for the 1973–74 and 1974–75 seasons, all other Ragin Cajun' athletic programs were placed on three years' probation and banned from postseason participation, and the university was stripped of voting rights at the NCAA convention until 1977 (the NCAA originally planned to expel USL from the organization, but that sanction was downgraded in January 1974).

Schedule and venues
The following are the sites that were selected to host each round of the 1973 tournament:

First round
March 10
East Region
 Alumni Hall, Jamaica, New York
 The Palestra, Philadelphia, Pennsylvania
 William & Mary Hall, Williamsburg, Virginia
Mideast Region
 University of Dayton Arena, Dayton, Ohio
Midwest Region
 Levitt Arena, Wichita, Kansas
West Region
 Dee Glen Smith Spectrum, Logan, Utah

Regional semifinals, 3rd-place games, and finals (Sweet Sixteen and Elite Eight)
March 15 and 17
East Regional, Charlotte Coliseum, Charlotte, North Carolina
Mideast Regional, Memorial Gymnasium, Nashville, Tennessee
Midwest Regional, Hofheinz Pavilion, Houston, Texas
West Regional, Pauley Pavilion, Los Angeles, California

National semifinals, 3rd-place game, and championship (Final Four and championship)
March 24 and 26
St. Louis Arena, St. Louis, Missouri

Teams

Bracket
* – Denotes overtime period

East region

Mideast region

Midwest region

West region

Final Four

Aftermath
The 1973 NC State Wolfpack team averaged 93 points per game (ppg), led the nation in win margin (21.8 ppg), and posted a 27–0 record, but was ineligible for postseason play because of NCAA probation. David Thompson, a two-time national Player of the Year, and All-America Tom Burleson, led NC State to a 30–1 record the following season, losing only to seven-time defending champion UCLA. The Wolfpack avenged its only loss during the two-year period by defeating UCLA in the 1974 Final Four and winning the title.

Gene Bartow, the Memphis State coach, would be John Wooden's successor at UCLA after the 1974–1975 season.

The tournament marked the last appearance of the Oklahoma City Chiefs, whose 11 tournament appearances are the most among teams no longer in Division I. The school would transition to the NAIA in 1985.

See also
 1973 NCAA College Division basketball tournament
 1973 National Invitation Tournament
 1973 NAIA Division I men's basketball tournament
 1973 National Women's Invitation Tournament

References

NCAA Division I men's basketball tournament
Ncaa
Basketball in Houston
NCAA Division I men's basketball tournament
NCAA Division I men's basketball tournament